Valentyna Savchuk (born 19 January 1975) is a female race walker from Ukraine.

Achievements

References
sports-reference

1975 births
Living people
Ukrainian female racewalkers
Athletes (track and field) at the 2000 Summer Olympics
Olympic athletes of Ukraine
Universiade medalists in athletics (track and field)
Universiade bronze medalists for Ukraine
Medalists at the 1999 Summer Universiade